Major-General Harold Percy Waller Barrow  (30 June 1876 – 20 December 1957) was Colonel Commandant, Royal Army Medical Corps (1941–46) and an Honorary Surgeon to King George V.

Life
Harold Percy Waller Barrow was born in Madras Presidency, India on 30 June 1876. He was the son of an Army Surgeon, Henry John Waller Barrow, and Florence Ellie Macdonald. Barrow was educated at Bedford Modern School and Guy's Hospital, London.

Barrow joined the Royal Army Medical Corps from Guy's in 1898. He served in the South African War, World War I, and the Third Anglo-Afghan War in 1919.

In 1919 he was appointed Director of Hygiene and Pathology in India and later Director of Hygiene at the War Office between 1924 and 1930. In 1926 he was appointed an honorary surgeon to King George V. After his retirement he was sent to Antigua as health officer and he was a member of the Federal Executive Council of the Leeward Islands from 1930 until 1933.  From 1941 to 1946 he served as Colonel Commandant, Royal Army Medical Corps and from 1943 to 1952 he was a commissioner of the Royal Hospital Chelsea.

Barrow died in Hampshire, England on 20 December 1957.

References

External links
 Harold Percy Waller Barrow at the National Portrait Gallery

People educated at Bedford Modern School
Officers of the Order of the British Empire
Companions of the Distinguished Service Order
Companions of the Order of the Bath
Companions of the Order of St Michael and St George
1876 births
1957 deaths
Royal Army Medical Corps officers
British Army generals of World War II
British Army personnel of World War I
British Army personnel of the Second Boer War
British surgeons
British Army major generals
Military personnel of British India